Mary Grey, Countess of Kent (died 1 November 1702), suo jure 1st Baroness Lucas of Crudwell (née Mary Lucas), was an English peeress in her own right.

Origins
She was the only surviving child of John Lucas, 1st Baron Lucas (1606–1671) of Shenfield, Essex.

Marriage
On 2 March 1662/63 she married Anthony Grey, 11th Earl of Kent.

Suo jure peerage
Following her marriage Mary was created, at her father's request, suo jure Baroness Lucas of Crudwell on 7 May 1663. This new creation was granted a special remainder to Mary's heirs male by her husband Anthony Grey, 11th Earl of Kent, and failing which, to her heirs female without division. This was a unique remainder for the English peerage as it can not fall into abeyance between female co-heiresses but is inherited by the senior co-heiress alone.

Death and succession
Mary, Countess of Kent and Baroness Lucas, died in November 1700 and was succeeded in the barony by her eldest son Henry Grey, 1st Duke of Kent, who in August 1702 also succeeded his father as 12th Earl of Kent and was created Duke of Kent on 28 April 1710.

Notes

See also 
Wrest Park

References
Kidd, Charles, Williamson, David (editors). Debrett's Peerage and Baronetage (1990 edition). New York: St Martin's Press, 1990.

17th-century births
1702 deaths
Hereditary peeresses created by Charles II
English countesses
Daughters of barons
Barons Lucas